Pliomerina is a genus of trilobites. A new species, P. tashanensis, was described from the late Ordovician of China by Dong-Chan Lee in 2012.

References

Pliomeridae
Ordovician trilobites
Ordovician trilobites of Asia
Middle Ordovician first appearances
Late Ordovician extinctions